The North American F-86D/K/L Sabre (initially known as the YF-95 and widely known informally as the "Sabre Dog",) was an American transonic jet fighter aircraft. Developed for the United States Air Force in the late 1940s, it was an interceptor derivative of the North American F-86 Sabre. While the original F-86 Sabre was conceived as a day fighter, the F-86D was specifically developed as an all-weather interceptor. Originally designated as the YF-95 during development and testing, it was re-designated the F-86D before production began, despite only sharing 25% commonality of parts with the original F-86. Production models of the F-86D/K/L differed from other Sabres in that they had a larger fuselage, a larger afterburning engine, and a distinctive nose radome. The most-produced Sabre Dog variants (the "D" and "G" models) also mounted no guns, unlike the Sabre with its six M3 Browning .50 caliber machine guns, instead mounting air-to-air rockets (the "K" and "L" Sabre Dog variants mounted four 20mm M24A1 cannon).

Design and development
The YF-95 was a development of the F-86 Sabre, the first aircraft designed around the new  "Mighty Mouse" Folding-Fin Aerial Rocket (FFAR). Begun in March 1949, the unarmed prototype, 50-577, first flew on 22 December 1949, piloted by North American test pilot George Welch and was the first U.S. Air Force night fighter design with only a single crewman and a single engine, a J47-GE-17 with afterburner rated at  static thrust. Gun armament was eliminated in favor of a retractable under-fuselage tray carrying 24 unguided Mk. 4 rockets, then considered a more effective weapon against enemy bombers than a barrage of cannon fire. A second prototype, 50-578, was also built, but the YF-95 nomenclature was short-lived as the design was subsequently redesignated YF-86D.

A total of 2,504 D-models were built.

Operational history
Captain J. Slade Nash flew over a three km (1.8 mi.) course at the Salton Sea in southern California at a height of only . Another F-86D broke this world record on 16 July 1953, when Lieutenant Colonel William F. Barns, flying F-86D 51-6145 in the same path of the previous flight, achieved .

Variants

YF-95A prototype all-weather interceptor; two built; designation changed to YF-86D (North American model NA-164)
YF-86D  originally designated YF-95A.
F-86D  Production interceptor originally designated F-95A, 2,504 built.
F-86G  Provisional designation for F-86D variant with uprated engine and equipment changes, 406 built as F-86Ds.
YF-86K  Basic version of F-86D intended for export with rocket tray replaced by four 20 mm cannon and simplified fire control system, two conversions.
F-86K  NATO version of F-86D; MG-4 fire control system; four 20 mm M24A1 cannon with 132 rounds per gun; APG-37 radar. 120 were built by North American, 221 were assembled by Fiat.
F-86L  Upgrade conversion of F-86D with new electronics, extended wingtips and wing leading edges, revised cockpit layout, and uprated engine; 981 converted.

Operators
 Source: Dorr

 Royal Danish Air Force
 Received 59 ex-USAF F-86Ds 1958-1960; assigned to 723, 726 and 728 Squadrons.

 French Air Force
 Fiat built 62 F-86Ks for France (1956-1957), assigned to EC 1/13 "Artois", EC 2/13 "Alpes", and EC 3/13 "Auvergne" Squadrons. Serials were 55-4814/4844, 55-4846/4865, 55-4872/4874, 55-4876/4879.

 German Air Force
 Acquired 88 U.S. F-86Ks 22 July 1957–23 June 1958. The Ks were assigned to Jagdgeschwader 75/renamed 74.

 Greek Air Force
 Acquired 35 F-86Ds from the US. Were received in 1961 and retired in 1967 but kept as back up until 1969. F-86D was the first all weather fighter in Greek Air Force. F-86Ds were assigned to 337 & 343 Squadrons. Until 1964 they were in natural metal. Until after retirement they were in NATO camo.

 Honduran Air Force
 Acquired Six Venezuelan F-86Ks in 1970.

 Italian Air Force 
 Fiat produced 121 F-86Ks for Italy, 1955-1958. Also, 120 U.S. F-86Ks were acquired. F-86s were assigned to the AMI air groups: 6 Gruppo COT/1 Stormo, 17 Gruppo/1 Stormo, 23 Gruppo/1 Stormo, 21 Gruppo/51 Aerobrigata, 22 Gruppo/51 Aerobrigata and 12 Gruppo/4 Aerobrigata.

 Japanese Air Self-Defense Force
 Acquired 122 US F-86Ds, 1958–1961; assigned to four all-weather interceptor Hikōtai, and Air Proving Ground at Gifu.

 Royal Netherlands Air Force (Koninklijke Luchtmacht) (KLu)
 Acquired 57 U.S.-built and six Fiat-built F-86K Sabres, 1955–1956; and assigned to three squadrons, No. 700, 701 and 702. Operated until 1964.

 Royal Norwegian Air Force
 Acquired 60 U.S.-built F-86K Sabres, 1955–1956, and four Italian-assembled Fiat K-models.

 Philippine Air Force
 Acquired 20 F-86Ds, assigned to 8th Fighter Interceptor Squadron "Vampires" beginning 1960; part of the U.S. military assistance package.

 Republic of Korea Air Force
 Acquired 40 F-86Ds, beginning 20 June 1955.

 Republic of China Air Force

 Royal Thai Air Force
 Acquired 20 F-86Ls.

 United States Air Force

 Venezuelan Air Force
 Acquired 32 US-built F-86Fs, October 1955–December 1960; 1965 acquired 79 Fiat-built F-86Ks from West Germany.

 SFR Yugoslav Air Force
 Acquired 130 U.S.-made F-86Ds and operated them between 1961 and 1974. 32 of these were modified into a reconnaissance variant utilizing 3 Kodak K-24 cameras mounted in place of the FFAR rockets, the IF-86D.

Surviving aircraft

Specifications (F-86D-40-NA)

See also

References

Notes

Bibliography

 Allward, Maurice. F-86 Sabre. London: Ian Allan, 1978. .
 Angelucci, Enzo and Peter Bowers. The American Fighter: the Definite Guide to American Fighter Aircraft from 1917 to the Present. New York: Orion Books, 1987. .
 Curtis, Duncan. North American F-86 Sabre. Ramsbury, UK: Crowood, 2000. .
 Dorr, Robert F. F-86 Sabre Jet: History of the Sabre and FJ Fury. St. Paul, Minnesota: Motorbooks International Publishers, 1993. .
 Käsmann, Ferdinand C.W. Die schnellsten Jets der Welt: Weltrekord- Flugzeuge (in German). Oberhaching, Germany: Aviatic Verlag-GmbH, 1994. .
 Knaack, Marcelle Size. Encyclopedia of US Air Force Aircraft and Missile Systems, Volume 1, Post-World War Two Fighters, 1945-1973. Washington, DC: Office of Air Force History, 1978. .
 Robinson, Robbie. NATO F-86D/K Sabre Dogs. Le Havre, 2018, 120 p. .
 Swanborough,  F. Gordon. United States Military Aircraft Since 1909. London: Putnam, 1963. .
 Wagner, Ray. American Combat Planes - Second Edition. Garden City, New York: Doubleday and Company, 1968. .
 Wagner, Ray. The North American Sabre. London: Macdonald, 1963. No ISBN.
 Westrum, Ron. Sidewinder. Annapolis, Maryland: Naval Institute Press, 1999. .
 Wilson, Stewart. Combat Aircraft since 1945''. Fyshwick, ACT, Australia: Aerospace Publications Pty Ltd, 2000. .

External links

 Sabre site
 North American F-86D Sabre

F-086D Sabre
1940s United States fighter aircraft
Single-engined jet aircraft
Low-wing aircraft
F-86D